The 1988 European Athletics Indoor Championships were held in Budapest, Hungary on 5 and 6 March 1988.

Medal summary

Men

Women

Medal table

Participating nations

 (10)
 (6)
 (24)
 (1)
 (18)
 (3)
 (18)
 (9)
 (20)
 (23)
 (4)
 (42)
 (3)
 (28)
 (14)
 (4)
 (8)
 (8)
 (8)
 (1)
 (23)
 (28)
 (9)
 (4)
 (2)
 (32)
 (8)

See also 
 1988 in athletics (track and field)

External links 
 Results - men at GBRathletics.com
 Results - women at GBRathletics.com
  EAA - 1988 Results

 
European Athletics Indoor Championships
European Indoor
International athletics competitions hosted by Hungary
1988 in Hungarian sport
March 1988 sports events in Europe
1980s in Budapest